Grady Schools may refer to:
 Grady Municipal School District (New Mexico)
 Grady Independent School District (Texas)
 Grady Public Schools (Arkansas, defunct)